Gangdong is literally "east of the River".

Gangdong may refer to:

 Gangdong District, a district in Seoul, South Korea
 Gangdong-myeon, Gyeongju, a township in Gyeongju, North Gyeongsang
 Gangdong-myeon, Gangneung, a township in Gangneung, Gangwon
 Gangdong-dong, a neighborhood in Buk District, Ulsan
 Kangdong, a county in Pyongyang, North Korea